Gliese 42 is a star in the southern constellation of Sculptor. It is too faint to be seen with the naked eye, having an apparent visual magnitude of +7.3. The annual parallax shift of 70.56 mas provides a distance estimate of 46 light years. It has a relatively high proper motion, advancing 0.62 arcseconds across the sky per annum, and is moving closer to the Sun with a radial velocity of −13 km/s.

It is radiating 29% of the Sun's luminosity from its photosphere at an effective temperature of 4,822 K. The star has 66% of the Sun's radius.

Debris disk
The temperature of this dust was initially estimated as  according to measurement by Herschel Space Observatory.

References

External links
 
 
 
 

K-type main-sequence stars
Gliese, 0042
0042
005133
004148
Durchmusterung objects
J00530108-3021249
Sculptor (constellation)